Antonio Pena (Montevideo, 3 December 1894 - 7 December 1947) was a Uruguayan sculptor.

References

1894 births
1947 deaths
Uruguayan sculptors
Male sculptors
20th-century sculptors
Uruguayan male artists